Chingiz Mamedov (born 9 July 1989) is a Kyrgyzstani judoka who competes in the 90 kg category. He was flag bearer at the 2012 Summer Olympics. He was 3 times Kyrgyz National Champion (2007 & 2008 -81 kg, and 2010 -90 kg)

References

External links
 
 
 

Kyrgyzstani male judoka
1989 births
Living people
People from Jambyl Region
Judoka at the 2012 Summer Olympics
Olympic judoka of Kyrgyzstan
Judoka at the 2010 Asian Games
Asian Games competitors for Kyrgyzstan
20th-century Kyrgyzstani people
21st-century Kyrgyzstani people